Eric Robertson may refer to:

 Eric Robertson (literary critic), professor at Royal Holloway, University of London
 Eric Robertson (athlete) (1892–1975), British athlete
 Eric Robertson (composer) (born 1948), Scottish composer, organist, pianist, and record producer
 Eric Robertson (politician), American law enforcement officer and politician from Washington, U.S.
 Eric Sutherland Robertson (1857–1926), Scottish man of letters, academic in India, and clergyman

See also
Erik Robertson (born 1984), American football guard
Eric Roberson (born 1976), American R&B and soul singer-songwriter
Eric Roberts (disambiguation)